Musom is an Austronesian language spoken in the single village of Musom in Labuta Rural LLG, Morobe Province, Papua New Guinea.  The other name for Musom is Misatik, given by the older generations because this was the name of the village that the ancestors settled on. Musom is currently an endangered language due to the fact that native Musom speakers are continuing to marry other language speakers.  Musom is also endangered because of its change in grammar and vocabulary due to its bi- and multilingualism.  In the Musom village, other languages that Musom speakers may speak are Aribwuang and Duwet.  In the Gwabadik village, because of intermarriages other languages that Musom speakers may speak are Nabak and Mesem.

Phonology 

In Musom, voiceless, voiced and prenasalised voice are the only series of stops when it comes to consonants.  For Musom consonants, if there is a prenasalised voice stop, the vowel is then seen after it and is can be as nasal only.  Allophones are contained in the prenasalised voiced affricated alveolar stop /ndz/ which occurs initially, medially, and then [nts] occurs finally.

For the consonants, /w, kw, gw/ they do not occur initially, medially and finally, but all other consonants do.  Other consonants that do not occur finally are /d, g, ndz/.  When the word ends in with a consonant and the next word also begins with a consonant, a prothetic a is put in between the words.  For the consonant /r/, it contains two allophones [r] and [l], but only in free variation.  

When Musom is compared to Yabim, there are claims that infer that Musom may have a 7-vowel system.

Syllable Structure 
Musom language has a syllable structure of (C) V (C) (V) (C).

Morphophonemics 
In Musom language, if a speaker were to talk fast, /u/ could be heard as [i].  Some examples that could be heard are:

 num > [nim] drink
 wutsin . [witsin] inside

If a subject pronoun prefix that contains a vowel, comes before the root that is within a vowel (verb root), the verb root changes according to what came before it.  Some examples are:

 mbidi              stand upa-mbidi          1st person subject > u-mbudi   2nd person subject

i-mbidi           3rd person subject

 mbitsi             cook on fire

a-mbitsi          1st person subject > u-mbutsi    2nd person subject

i-imbitsi           3rd person subject

Words that contain multiple syllables, those syllables could be dropped or centralized.  A vowel turns into schwa [ə] in the unstressed syllable.  Here is an example:

 'apun        completive particle > ['apm] ~ ['apəm]

Pronouns 
Focal pronouns are able to be used as subjects and objects of verbs.  Prepositions only occur with objects of verbs.  Focal pronouns are also found in a possessive phrase.  For 1st singular, short form only occurs when wir is switched for u or ur.

Interrogative pronouns can be seen with who and what.  In Musom, who and what can be used with two different pronouns.  Those two different pronouns are:

 asa "who"
 sira "what"

Some examples of these two pronouns are:

 in asa?                                   Who is he?Rak anu sira?                        What is that there?

Asa ngaing gi-its ingg?          Who hit you? (lit. Which man hit you?)

Both reflexive and emphatic pronouns both mean Pronoun + self.  This table shows the reflexive and emphatic pronouns:

Possession 
The first type of possession in Musom has inalienable nouns.  Some examples of these inalienable nouns are kin terms, body parts, name, namesake, friend or trade partner.   

The second type of possession in Musom is Alienable possession.  The second type of possession holds all the nouns that are not in the first type.  The possessive phrase can contain noun or pronoun possession, and prothetic a.  Then there is a noun that is not attributed to the possessive markers which is the noun possessed.  Here are some examples:

 wir a om                          my house

ingg a mimin                   your betelnut

in a tahung                      his smoke

is a kom/kom a is en       their dog

Sentence Structure

Coordination 
In the Musom language, sentences can be formed by using conjunctions such as da 'and, but' and ma 'or'.  One example using da is:

 Tse             g-a-k             g-a-bitsi              ung               da                g-a-hur

weEXC      P-SPP1-go   P-SPP1-cook     breadfruit      and              P-SPP1-fish

We cooked breadfruit and fished (for crayfish) in the river.

One example using ma is:

 Ingg           ng-u-ak                 Madang             ma                ingg               ng-u-ak

youSG       IRR-SPP2-go       Madang             or                  youSG           IRR-SPP2-go

You can go to Madang or you can go to Ramu.

Conditional 
The Musom language when using conditional sentences can be found in the form of:

da + Subject 1 + ng-SPP-V da + Subject 2 bo-ng-SPP-V

An example using a conditional sentence is:

 Da    amik        ng-i-ruk              wir       bo-ng-a-bum                  omb.

and  rain          IRR-SPP3-fall    I           FUT-IRR-SPP1-stay      village

If it rains I will stay in the village

References

Wurm, S.A. editor. Some Endangered Languages of Papua New Guinea: Kaki Ae, Musom, and Aribwatsa. D-89, vi + 183 pages. Pacific Linguistics, The Australian National University, 1997.

Definitely endangered languages
Markham languages
Languages of Morobe Province